Spiral (Spiral [adj.], Spirally), for a soloist with a shortwave receiver, is a composition by Karlheinz Stockhausen, written in 1968. It is Number 27 in the catalogue of the composer's works.

Conception
Spiral is one of a series of works dating from the 1960s which Stockhausen designated as "process" compositions. These works in effect separate the "form" from the "content" by presenting the performers with a series of transformation signs which are to be applied to material that may vary considerably from one performance to the next. In Spiral and three companion works (Kurzwellen for six performers, Pole for two, and Expo for three), this material is to be drawn spontaneously during the performance from shortwave radio broadcasts. The processes, indicated primarily by plus, minus, and equal signs, constitute the composition and, despite the unpredictability of the materials, these processes can be heard from one performance to another as being "the same".

History

Spiral was composed in Madison, Connecticut in September 1968 and was premiered on 15 May 1969 at the Muzički Biennale Zagreb, with the oboist Heinz Holliger as the soloist. Holliger performed it subsequently in Saint-Paul-de-Vence, and on 10 July 1969 at the Cheltenham Music Festival. Between 14 March and 14 September 1970, Spiral was given 1300 times at Expo '70 in Osaka, Japan, in daily performances by twenty different musicians including the composer. The score is dedicated to the other nineteen: the six singers of the Collegium Vocale Köln (Dagmar Apel, Gaby Rodens, Helga Albrecht, Wolfgang Fromme, Siegfried Bernhöft, and Hans Alderich Billig), and instrumentalists David C. Johnson (flute with synthesizer), Michael Vetter (electric recorder), Edward Tarr (trumpet), Karlheinz Böttner (electric guitar), Christoph Caskel and Michael Ranta (percussion), Rolf Gehlhaar (tamtam),  (electronium and piano), Péter Eötvös (55-chord and piano), Gérard Frémy and Aloys Kontarsky (piano), Johannes Fritsch (electric viola), and Mesías Maiguashca (sound direction).

Structure and technique

Spiral consists of a sequence of 206 events, grouped into ten sections which are divided in the score by wavy barlines. Stockhausen explained that in pieces like this, "the first step is always that of imitating something and the next step is that of transforming what you're able to imitate". The first event is realized with the short-wave receiver and the instrument/voice together. The subsequent events freely alternate performance by the radio, by the instrument or voice, and their combination, though a balance should be aimed for between events with and without radio sounds.

Each plus, minus, or equal sign indicates that, upon repetition of an event, the performer is to increase, decrease, or maintain the same level in one of four musical dimensions (or "parameters"): overall duration of the event, number of internal subdivisions, dynamic level, or pitch register/range. It is up to the performer to decide which of these dimensions is to be affected, except that vertically stacked signs must be applied to different parameters. Despite this indeterminacy, a large number of plus signs (for example) will result in successive events becoming longer, more finely subdivided, louder, and either higher or wider in range; a large number of minus signs will produce the reverse effect. To the signs previously used in Prozession and Kurzwellen, Stockhausen adds a dozen new ones. An especially important one is the "spiral sign", consisting of a column of different combinations of four or five plus or minus signs bracketed by repeat marks. At this sign, the performer is to repeat the previous event several times, transposing it each time in all parameters, and attempt to transcend not only previous limits reached in the piece, but also to go beyond the limitations of the instrument/voice itself. In doing this, the performer is encouraged to employ visual and theatrical possibilities. Because there are only seven "spiral" signs altogether, not every section contains one of them. Spiral is not ordinarily performed complete: the performer may end a version at any of the wavy barlines, and then for the next performance should resume where the previous one left off. On the other hand, the end of the score is marked "da capo" so that, should a chosen starting point result in the end being reached too soon, the performer may continue again from the beginning. Most performances last between fifteen and twenty-five minutes, and Stockhausen did not authorise a full-length version until Michael Vetter convinced him to permit such a thing. The first complete performance was realised by Michael Vetter and was recorded on 22 November 1995 at the Ballhorn Tonstudio in Odenthal.

Discography
 Karlheinz Stockhausen, Sylvano Bussotti. Spiral für einen Spieler und Kurzwellen (1968); Rara (dolce) für Blockflöte (Duofassung) (1966). Michael Vetter, voice, amplified alto recorder head joint, shortwave radio. Wergo Taschendiskothek 20. Jahrhundert. 7-inch LP. Wergo WER 325. Baden-Baden: Wergo Schallplatten GmbH, [1969]. Spiral reissued (with two versions of Zyklus) 12-inch LP. WERGO Hörzu  SHZW 903BL.
 Heinz Holliger (oboe and short-wave radio; Stockhausen, sound direction). With Holliger: Siebengesang. DG LP. DG 2561 109.
 Stockhausen: Spiral (Version Elektrochord), Wach (aus den 17 Texten intuitiver Musik Für kommende Zeiten), Spiral (Version Elektronium), Japan (aus den 17 Texten intuitiver Musik Für kommende Zeiten), Pole (Version Elektronium & Elektrochord). Harald Bojé (electronium, shortwave radio, Japanese woodblock); Péter Eötvös (electrochord, schalmai, Japanese bamboo flute, shortwave radio); Christoph Caskel (percussion); Karlheinz Stockhausen (sound direction). (Recorded 8–10 December 1971, No. 2 Studio, Abbey Road, London.) EMI 2-LP set. EMI Electrola C165-02 313/314. Cologne: The Gramophone Company Ltd., EMI Electrola GmbH, 1973. Reissued with additional material (Zyklus for a percussionist, Tristan Fry, percussion; Tierkreis for trumpet and organ, and In Freundschaft for trumpet, Markus Stockhausen, trumpet, organ). 2-CD set. EMI Classics 6 95598 2. [N.p.]: EMI Records, 2009.
 Bojé and Eötvös (different versions from the EMI set). Spiral (2 Versionen); Pole. Péter Eötvös, Harald Bojé, Karlheinz Stockhausen. (Recorded 18 April 1971 at WDR, Cologne.) Stockhausen Complete Edition CD 15. Kürten: Stockhausen-Verlag, 1994.
Knut Sönstevold Plays Stockhausen. (Solo, In Freundschaft, Spiral, and Tierkreis.)  (bassoon); Kina Sönstevold (piano, in Tierkreis). CD. Nosag CD 042. Huddinge, Sweden: Nosag Records, 2000.
 Organic Oboe. Joseph Celli (oboe, cor anglais, shortwave receiver, voice, kazoo, wah-wah pedal, and various auxiliary sound producers). With Celli, Sky: S for J; Elliott Schwartz, Extended Oboe; Malcolm Goldstein, A Summoning of Focus. LP. O.O. Records 1. Hartford, Connecticut: Organic Oboe, Inc., 1978. Reissued on CD. O.O. Discs #1. [n.p.]: O.O. Disc Inc., 1991.
 Stockhausen, Karlheinz. Spiral (1968) for a Soloist.  (flute, voice, and shortwave receiver). (4 versions). CD. hatART CD 6132. Therwil: Hat Hut Records, 1993.
 Stockhausen, Karlheinz. Solo (2 Versionen)—Spiral. Cathy Milliken (voice, oboe, didgeridoo), in Spiral; Dietmar Wiesner (flute) and Simon Stockhausen (synthesizer), each in one version of Solo. Stockhausen Complete Edition CD 45. Kürten: Stockhausen-Vrlag, 1995.
 Stockhausen, Karlheinz. Spiral, Integrale Version. Michael Vetter, voice and short-wave receiver. 2-CD set. Stockhausen Complete Edition CD 46 A–B. Kürten: Stockhausen-Verlag, 1996.
 Warp Works & Twentieth Century Masters. Clive Williamson; Rolf Hind; Clio Gould; Simon Haram; Jurjen Hempel; Stefan Asbury; Aphex Twin.; Conlon Nancarrow; John Cage; Steve Reich; Squarepusher (Musician); Karlheinz Stockhausen; Edgard Varèse; György Ligeti. 2006, 2003. 2-CD set. WARPCD144; [S.l.]: Warp,

References

Cited sources

Further reading

 Castanet, Pierre Albert. 1998. "L'espace spiralé dans la musique contemporaine". In L'espace: Musique/philosophie, edited by Jean-Marc Chouvel and Makīs Solōmos, 85-103. Musique et musicologie: Les dialogues. Paris: L'Harmattan. .
 Frisius, Rudolf. 2008. Karlheinz Stockhausen II: Die Werke 1950–1977; Gespräch mit Karlheinz Stockhausen, "Es geht aufwärts". Mainz, London, Berlin, Madrid, New York, Paris, Prague, Tokyo, Toronto: Schott Musik International. .
 Fritsch, Johannes. 1979. "Prozessplanung". In Improvisation und neue Musik. Acht Kongressreferate, edited by Reinhold Brinkmann, 108–117. Veröffentlichungen des Instituts für Neue Musik und Musikerziehung Darmstadt 20. Mainz: Schott Musik International.
 Fritsch, Johannes, with Richard Toop. 2008. "Versuch, eine Grenze zu überschreiten ... Johannes Fritsch im Gespräch über die Aufführungspraxis von Werken Karlheinz Stockhausens". : Zeitschrift für neue Musik, no. 116 (February): 31–40.
 Geysen, Frans. 1977. "De spiraalgedachte van Stockhausen en anderer componisten". Adem: Driemaandelijks tijdschrift voor muziek cultuur 13, no. 3: 130–133.
 Harvey, Jonathan. 1975. The Music of Stockhausen: An Introduction. Berkeley and Los Angeles: University of California Press. .
 Hopp, Winrich. 1998. Kurzwellen von Karlheinz Stockhausen: Konzeption und musikalische Poiesis. Kölner Schriften zur neuen Musik 6. With CD recording. Mainz and New York: Schott. .
 Kurtz, Michael. 1992. Stockhausen: A Biography, translated by Richard Toop. London: Faber & Faber.
 Maconie, Robin. 2005. Other Planets: The Music of Karlheinz Stockhausen. Lanham, Maryland, Toronto, Oxford: The Scarecrow Press. .
 Peixinho, Jorge. 1972. "Stockhausen em Paris". Colóquio-artes: Revista de artes visuais, música e bailado 2, no. 6 (February): 53–54.
 Purce, Jill. 1973. "The Spiral in the Music of Karlheinz Stockhausen". Main Currents in Modern Thought 30, no. 1 (September–October). Taken from the collection Wie spielt man Stockhausen? Vienna: Universal Edition. French version, as "La Spirale dans la musique de Stockhausen". Musique en jeu (Forum de Musique Contemporaine), no. 1 (15 September 1974): 7–23.
 Rigoni, Michel. 1998. Stockhausen: ... un vaisseau lancé vers le ciel, second edition, revised, corrected, and enlarged. Lillebonne: Millénaire III Editions. .
 Schatt, Peter W. 1991. "Ein Lernprozeß als Kunstwerk: Karlheinz Stockhausens Spiral". Archiv für Musikwissenschaft 48, no. 4:300–311.
 Stockhausen, Karlheinz. 2009. Kompositorische Grundlagen Neuer Musik: Sechs Seminare für die Darmstädter Ferienkurse 1970, edited by Imke Misch. Kürten: Stockhausen-Stiftung für Musik. .
 . 1973. Stockhausen: Life and Work, translated by Bill Hopkins. Berkeley: University of California Press. 

Compositions by Karlheinz Stockhausen
20th-century classical music
1968 compositions
Music dedicated to ensembles or performers
Serial compositions
Process music pieces
Spatial music